Lysebottnuten  is a mountain in the municipality of Ål in Buskerud, Norway. The climate around Lysebottnuten is a tundra.  In 2000, there were around 3 people per square kilometer residing near Lysebottnuten.

References

Mountains of Viken